The 15th National Congress of the People's Party was held in Madrid from 1 to 3 October 2004, to renovate the governing bodies of the People's Party (PP) and establish the party's main lines of action and strategy for the next leadership term. The congress slogan was "Spain, the hope that unites us", and it saw Mariano Rajoy being elected unopposed as party president, with 98.4% of the delegate vote in the congress (2,479 votes) and 1.6% of blank ballots (41).

Overview
The congress of the PP was the party's supreme body, and could be of either ordinary or extraordinary nature, depending on whether it was held following the natural end of its term or due to any other exceptional circumstances not linked to this event. Ordinary congresses were to be held every three years and called at least two months in advance of their celebration. Extraordinary congresses had to be called by a two-thirds majority of the Board of Directors at least one-and-a-half month in advance of their celebration, though in cases of "exceptional urgency" this deadline could be reduced to thirty days.

The president of the PP was the party's head and the person holding the party's political and legal representation, and presided over its board of directors and executive committee, which were the party's maximum directive, governing and administration bodies between congresses. The election of the PP president was based on an indirect system, with party members voting for delegates who would, in turn, elect the president. Any party member was eligible for the post of party president, on the condition that they were up to date with the payment of party fees and were proposed by at least 50 congress delegates.

Candidates

Declined
The individuals in this section were the subject of speculation about their possible candidacy, but publicly denied or recanted interest in running:

Ángel Acebes (age ) — Deputy in the Cortes Generales for Ávila (since 1996); Minister of the Interior of Spain (2002–2004); Minister of Justice of Spain (2000–2002); Minister of Public Administrations of Spain (1999–2000); Coordinator-General of the PP (1996–1999); Spokesperson of the PP Group in the Senate of Spain (1995–1996); Senator in the Cortes Generales for Ávila (1993–1996); Mayor of Ávila (1991–1995); City Councillor of Ávila (1987–1995).
Javier Arenas (age ) — President of the PP of Andalusia (1993–1999 and since 2004); Deputy in the Cortes Generales for Seville (1989–1994 and since 2000); Second Deputy Prime Minister of Spain (2003–2004); Minister of the Presidency of Spain (2003–2004); Minister of Public Administrations of Spain; (2002–2003); Secretary-General of the PP (1999–2003); Minister of Labour and Social Affairs of Spain (1996–1999); Senator in the Cortes Generales appointed by the Parliament of Andalusia (1994–1996); Deputy in the Parliament of Andalusia for Seville (1986–1989 and 1994–1996).
José María Aznar (age ) — President of the PP (since 1990); Prime Minister of Spain (1996–2004); Deputy in the Cortes Generales for Ávila and Madrid (1982–1987 and 1989–2004); President pro tempore of the Council of the European Union (2002); President of AP/PP of Castile and León (1985–1991); President of the Junta of Castile and León (1987–1989); Procurator in the Cortes of Castile and León for Ávila (1987–1989); Secretary-General of AP in La Rioja (1979–1980).
Alberto Ruiz-Gallardón (age ) — Mayor of Madrid (since 2003); City Councillor of Madrid (1983–1987 and since 2003); President of the Community of Madrid (1995–2003); Deputy in the Assembly of Madrid (1987–2003); Spokesperson of the PP Group in the Senate of Spain (1993–1995); Senator in the Cortes Generales appointed by the Assembly of Madrid (1987–1995); Spokesperson of the AP/PP Group in the Assembly of Madrid (1987–1993); Vice President of AP (1987–1989); Secretary-General of AP (1986–1987).
Jaime Mayor Oreja (age ) — Spokesperson of the PP Delegation in the European Parliament (since 2004); Member of the European Parliament for Spain (since 2004); Vice Secretary-General of the PP (since 1996); Deputy in the Cortes Generales for Álava, Biscay and Gipuzkoa (1982, 1989–1990, 1996–2001 and 2004); Deputy in the Basque Parliament for Álava, Biscay and Gipuzkoa (1980, 1984–1986, 1990–1996 and 2001–2004); Minister of the Interior of Spain (1996–2001); Spokesperson of the PP Group in the Basque Parliament (1990–1996); President of the PP of the Basque Country (1989–1996); Government's Delegate in the Basque Country (1982–1983); Minister of Industry, Tourism and Trade of the Basque Country (1979–1980).
Rodrigo Rato (age ) — Managing Director of the International Monetary Fund (since 2004); First Deputy Prime Minister of Spain (2003–2004); Vice Secretary-General of the PP (1996–2004); Deputy in the Cortes Generales for Cádiz and Madrid (1982–2004); Second Deputy Prime Minister for Economic Affairs of Spain (2000–2003); Minister of Economy of Spain (2000–2003); Second Deputy Prime Minister of Spain (1996–2000); Minister of Economy and Finance of Spain (1996–2000); Spokesperson of the PP Group in the Congress of Deputies (1989–1996).

Opinion polls
Poll results are listed in the tables below in reverse chronological order, showing the most recent first, and using the date the survey's fieldwork was done, as opposed to the date of publication. If such date is unknown, the date of publication is given instead. The highest percentage figure in each polling survey is displayed in bold, and the background shaded in the candidate's colour. In the instance of a tie, the figures with the highest percentages are shaded.

PP voters

Spanish voters

Results

References
Opinion poll sources

Other

Political party assemblies in Spain
People's Party (Spain)
Political party leadership elections in Spain
2004 conferences